Volmari "Valmari" Toikka (December 27, 1902 in Kannusjärvi, Kymenlaakso – December 21, 1990) was a Finnish cross-country skier who competed in the 1932 Winter Olympics.

He was born in Kannusjärvi, Kymenlaakso and died in Vehkalahti.

In 1932 he finished seventh in the 18 km event.

Cross-country skiing results

Olympic Games

External links
 profile

1902 births
1990 deaths
People from Hamina
People from Viipuri Province (Grand Duchy of Finland)
Finnish male cross-country skiers
Olympic cross-country skiers of Finland
Cross-country skiers at the 1932 Winter Olympics
Sportspeople from Kymenlaakso
20th-century Finnish people